The Waigeo brushturkey (Aepypodius bruijnii) or Bruijn's brushturkey, is a large (approximately 43 cm long) brownish-black megapode with a bare red facial skin, red comb, maroon rump and chestnut brown below. There are two elongated red wattles on the back of the head and a long wattle on the foreneck. Both sexes are similar. The female has a smaller comb and no wattles.

An Indonesian endemic, the Waigeo brushturkey inhabits mountain forests on Waigeo Island of West Papua.

Previously known from less than twenty-five specimens, this little-known species was relocated in 2002. The name commemorates the Dutch merchant Anton August Bruijn.

This bird is threatened by hunting, ongoing habitat loss, small population size and a limited range. It was formerly classified as a Vulnerable species by the IUCN. But new research has shown it to be rarer than it was believed. Consequently, it was uplisted to Endangered status in 2008.

References 

 BirdLife International (BLI) (2008): [2008 IUCN Redlist status changes]. Retrieved 2008-MAY-23.

External links 
 BirdLife Species Factsheet
 Red Data Book

Waigeo brushturkey
Birds of the Raja Ampat Islands
Waigeo brushturkey
Taxa named by Émile Oustalet